The Dickson Poon School of Law is the law school of King's College London, itself part of the federal University of London, and serves as one of the nine schools of study within the college. It is situated on the Strand in the East Wing of Somerset House, in close proximity to the Royal Courts of Justice and the four Inns of Court in the heart of London's legal quarter. Among the most prestigious and selective law schools in the world, is currently ranked in the global top 15 and fifth in both Europe and the UK.

Following a donation of £20 million by Dickson Poon in 2012, the school was renamed in his honour. The current dean of the school is Professor Gillian Douglas.

History
Law has been taught at King's College London since 1831. It was originally taught within the Senior Department. In 1839, teaching transferred to the Department of General Literature and Science in response to the need for a greater differentiation of the syllabus for students of the Senior Department at the King's. Law became part of a broad faculty of subjects and classes that provided a core liberal syllabus in the arts and sciences available to all students of King's. From 1893, it was known as the Division of Laws and Economics under the Faculty of Arts.

The Faculty of Laws was founded in 1909 and became known as the School of Law in 1991. The school took its current name in 2012 in recognition of Hong Kong businessman Sir Dickson Poon, who made a gift of £20 million to the school. It is thought to be the largest-ever donation to a British or European law faculty at the time.

The school is in the heart of legal London. It was previously housed in a row of buildings adjacent to the Strand and Embankment along the River Thames. On 7 December 2009, it was announced that the school would relocate to the East Wing of Somerset House, a prominent example of neo-classical architecture, designed by Sir William Chambers in the late eighteenth century on the site of an earlier Tudor palace. Negotiations for the new lease are said to have taken some 180 years. In February 2012, the refurbished East Wing was officially opened by the patron of the college, Queen Elizabeth II.

The first dean of the school was David Caron, formerly of the University of California, Berkeley. Caron's appointment followed the renaming of the school and its new focus on transnational law. The school is also one of the ten international law schools that are members of the Center for Transnational Legal Studies (CTLS). Caron describes the typical graduate of the school as "a transnational, global, lawyer with [...] roots in the historic tradition of the English common law that has influenced, and in turn been influenced by, much of the world, and in the more recent tradition of European Union law. They 'think global' because we teach them with a transnational perspective."

Education

The school provides legal instruction at undergraduate and graduate levels. It offers a three-year undergraduate LLB programme. Candidates are required to take the National Admissions Test for Law (LNAT) as part of the admissions process. In addition to the three-year undergraduate LLB, the school offers a number of joint programmes with partner institutions around the world including the United States (Columbia University), France (Université Paris 1 Panthéon-Sorbonne), Germany (Humboldt University), Hong Kong (University of Hong Kong), and Australia (Monash University).

The school offers a four-year LLB in law with transnational legal studies as part of its work with the Centre for Transnational Legal Studies. In 2012, the school saw the admission of its first cohort for its LLB in philosophy, politics, and law, a four-year multi-disciplinary degree that will build on the work of the Yeoh Tiong Lay Centre for Philosophy, Politics & Law.

The school also offers Ivy-League style scholarships based on academic merit awarded to students who demonstrate academic excellence, outstanding potential, and life ambition.

Graduate programmes include full-time and part-time LLM and MA programmes, as well as distance-learning courses for legal practitioners. Since 2007 the school has conferred its own Master of Laws (LLM) degree, having previously been a contributor to the University of London intercollegiate programme. Those who study for the degree may elect to take a specialisation in one of several of the school's strengths, including international commercial law, international financial law and European Union law. The school also offers a dual degree with ESSEC Business School in France and the Global School of Law in Lisbon.

The school offers a full-time graduate research programme leading to the award of the PhD in law. The school has 80 doctoral researchers. The school has hosted the annual International Graduate Legal Research Conference since 2007. The Graduate Legal Research Society arranges educational and social events for the doctoral researcher community and liaises with school management on behalf of the community.

Finally, the school is one of six constituent law faculties within the University of London - along with those of University College London, the London School of Economics, Queen Mary University London, the School of Oriental & African Studies and Birkbeck, University of London - that collectively oversee and examine an intercollegiate LLB offered by distance learning and awarded by the university at large through its University of London Worldwide scheme. One of the largest legal education programs by enrollment globally, it lays claim to being the oldest LLB program grounded in the law of England & Wales with roots dating to the 1890's.

Research
The school is host to research projects funded by the British Academy, the Economic and Social Research Council, and the European Commission. The school includes various research centres and groups which serve as focal points for research activity. These include the Centre of European Law, established in 1974, the Centre of Medical Law and Ethics, established in 1978, and the Centre of British Constitutional Law and History, established in 1988.

In 2013, the Yeoh Tiong Lay Centre for Politics, Philosophy & Law was established following a £7 million gift from Mark Yeoh (LLB graduate) and his family.

The school has undertaken significant investment in the field of transnational law in recent years and has established an Institute of Transnational Law led by Peer Zumbansen.

Publications
The school publishes the scholarly King's Law Journal, as well as the King's Student Law Review. The Centre of European Law publishes a paper series, Working Papers in European Law. The International State Crime Initiative publishes a range of reports, commentaries, and other materials on state crime. The faculty at the school are regular authors of monographs, scholarly treatises and articles, and contributions to periodicals. Latest publications from the Dickson Poon School of Law are available on King's Research Portal.

Reputation
It is one of the highest ranked institutions for the study of law in the United Kingdom and the world. In 2020, the Dickson Poon School of Law ranked 15th in the world and 4th in Europe in the QS World University Rankings.

Notable faculty
 Ben Bowling, professor of criminology and criminal justice and former acting dean of the Dickson Poon School of Law
 David Caron, professor of law and former dean of the Dickson Poon School of Law
 Gillian Douglas, professor of family law and dean of the Dickson Poon School of Law
 Keith Ewing, professor of public law
 Sir Francis Jacobs, professor of European law and president of the Centre for European Law
 Igor Judge, Baron Judge, Dickson Poon distinguished visitor, Lord Chief Justice of England and Wales (2008-2013), convenor of the Crossbench Peers in the House of Lords
 Lady Hale, visiting professor, president of the Supreme Court of the United Kingdom (2017-2020)
 Toby Landau, QC, visiting professor, a renowned British lawyer and arbitration expert 
 Eva Lomnicka, visiting professor
 Aileen McColgan, professor of human rights law
 John Phillips, professor of law
 Nicholas Phillips, Baron Phillips of Worth Matravers, Dickson Poon distinguished visitor
 Raymond Plant, Baron Plant of Highfield, professor of law
 Joseph Raz, research professor of jurisprudence
 Takis Tridimas, professor of European law
 John Tasioulas, professor of politics, philosophy and law and director of the Yeoh Tiong Lay Centre for Politics, Philosophy & Law
 Samuel Wordsworth, QC, visiting professor, the leading public international law silk 
 Peer Zumbansen, professor of transnational law and director of the Transnational Law Institute

Notable alumni

Kwadwo Agyei Agyapong, Ghanaian High Court judge
Karim Ahmad Khan, Chief Prosecutor of the International Criminal Court
Shafique Ahmed, Bangladeshi Justice Minister
Michael Ashikodi Agbamuche, Attorney General & Minister for Justice of Nigeria (1994–97)
Brian Altman, lead Counsel for the Independent Inquiry into Child Sexual Abuse
Georgios Anastassopoulos, Greek MEP
Dame Geraldine Andrews, High Court Judge (2013–)
Sir Robin Auld, Lord Justice of Appeal
Azhar Azizan Harun, Speaker of the Dewan Rakyat
Ziad Bahaa-Eldin, Deputy Prime Minister of Egypt
Abd al-Rahman al-Bazzaz, Prime Minister of Iraq (1965–66)
Godfrey Binaisa, President of Uganda (1979–80)
Sir Patrick Bishop, Conservative Member of Parliament
Sir Louis Blom-Cooper, author and lawyer
Harold Bollers, Chief Justice of Guyana (1966–80)
Terence Boston, Baron Boston of Faversham, Labour Member of Parliament and Crossbench peer
Magnus Brunner, Member of the Austrian Federal Council
Haresh Budhrani, Speaker of the Gibraltar Parliament
Alex Carlile, Baron Carlile of Berriew
Dame Bobbie Cheema-Grubb, High Court Judge (2015–)
Sir Fielding Clarke, Chief Justice of Fiji, Hong Kong and Jamaica
Glafcos Clerides, President of Cyprus (1993–2003)
Stanley Clinton-Davis, Baron Clinton-Davis, Labour Member of Parliament and peer and UK EU Commissioner
Michael Collins - Chairman of the Irish Provisional Government (1922)
Abdulai Conteh, Vice President of Sierra Leone
Philippe Couvreur, Registrar of the International Court of Justice
Edmund Davies, Baron Edmund-Davies, Lord of Appeal in Ordinary (1974–1981)
Segun Toyin Dawodu - Attorney, Physician and founder of Dawodu.com (Premier website on Nigeria's history and socio-political issues)
Sushmita Dev, Member of the Indian Lok Sabha
Andrew Dunlop, Baron Dunlop, Conservative peer
Jerome Fitzgerald, Bahamian Education Minister
Marlene Malahoo Forte, Attorney General of Jamaica
Sir David Foskett, High Court Judge (2007–)
Sir Cyril Fountain, Chief Justice of the Bahamas
Alan Ganoo, Speaker of the National Assembly of Mauritius
Harry Gem, inventor of the lawn tennis
Colleen Graffy, US Deputy Assistant Secretary of State
Dame Katherine Grainger, Olympic gold medal winning rower
Faisal Saleh Hayat, Pakistani Interior Minister
Anisul Huq, Bangladeshi Justice Minister
Chukwunweike Idigbe, Justice of the Supreme Court of Nigeria
Faizah Jamal, Member of the Singaporean Parliament
K. C. Kamalasabayson, Attorney General of Sri Lanka
Olga Kefalogianni, Greek Cabinet Minister
Cecil Kelsick, Chief Justice of Trinidad and Tobago
Asma Khan, chef and cookbook author
Sir Muhammad Zafarullah Khan, President of the UN General Assembly (1962–63); President of the ICJ (1970–73)
Sir Leonard Knowles, first Chief Justice of The Bahamas
Abdul Koroma, Judge of the International Court of Justice
Dennis Kwok, Member of the Hong Kong Legislative Council
Francine Lacqua, Bloomberg Television anchor
David Nana Larbie, Member of the Ghanaian Parliament
Axelle Lemaire, Member of the French National Assembly
Brandon Lewis, Chairman of the Conservative Party
John MacGregor, Baron MacGregor of Pulham Market, politician; Leader of the House of Commons (1990–92)
Jonathan Maitland, broadcaster
Nthomeng Majara, Chief Justice of Lesotho
Wayne Martin, former Chief Justice of Western Australia (2006–2018)
Peter McCormick, lawyer
Hugh McDermott, Member of the New South Wales Parliament
Anne McLellan, Deputy Prime Minister of Canada
Francis Minah, Vice President of Sierra Leone
Trevor Moniz, Attorney General of Bermuda
Sir Lee Moore, Prime Minister of Saint Kitts and Nevis (1979–80)
Krisztina Morvai, Hungarian MEP
Nik Nazmi Nik Ahmad, Member of the Selangor State Legislative Assembly
Ned Nwoko, Member of the Nigerian House of Representatives
Chibudom Nwuche, Member of the Nigerian House of Representatives
George Nyamweya, Member of the Kenyan National Assembly
James Nyamweya, Kenyan Foreign Minister
Nuala O'Loan, Baroness O'Loan, Crossbench peer
Sam Okudzeto, Member of the Ghanaian Parliament
Nneka Onyeali-Ikpe, CEO of Fidelity Bank Nigeria
Tassos Papadopoulos, President of Cyprus (2003–08)
Sir David Penry-Davey, High Court judge
Sir Lynden Pindling, Prime Minister of the Bahamas (1967–92)
Sir Allan Powell, previous Chairman of the BBC
Tim Pryce, CEO of Terra Firma Capital Partners
Henry George Purchase, Liberal Member of Parliament
S. Rajaratnam, Deputy Prime Minister of Singapore
Sir Shridath Ramphal, Commonwealth Secretary-General (1975–90)
Sophon Ratanakorn, President of the Supreme Court of Thailand
Faris Al-Rawi, Attorney General of Trinidad and Tobago and Member of the House of Representatives
France-Albert René, President of the Seychelles (1977–2004)
Patrick Lipton Robinson, Judge of the International Court of Justice
Sir Hugh Rossi, Conservative Member of Parliament
Dame Angela Rumbold, Conservative Member of Parliament
Julius Sarkodee-Addo, Chief Justice of Ghana
Dan Sarooshi, Professor of Public International Law at the University of Oxford
Khushwant Singh, writer and Member of the Indian Rajya Sabha
Muthucumaraswamy Sornarajah, C. J. Koh Professor of Law at the National University of Singapore
Christopher de Souza, Member of the Singaporean Parliament
Gary Streeter, Conservative Member of Parliament
Sir Jeremy Sullivan, Lord Justice of Appeal (2009–2015); Senior President of Tribunals (2012–2015)
Jaishanker Manilal Shelat, Judge, Supreme Court of India (1966–72)
Rory Tapner, CEO of Coutts
Shekou Touray, Permanent Representative of Sierra Leone to the United Nations
Hassan al-Turabi, Sudanese Foreign Minister and Attorney General
Lawrence Urquhart, Chairman of BAA
Muhammad Uteem, Member of the Mauritian National Assembly
Michael Kijana Wamalwa, Vice President of Kenya
Sidney Webb, 1st Baron Passfield, co-founder of London School of Economics
Dame Heather Williams, High Court Judge (2021–)
Frederick Wills, Guyanese Foreign Minister
Elizabeth Wilmshurst, Professor of International Law at University College London
Alvin Yeo, Member of the Singaporean Parliament
Lois Michele Young, Permanent Representative of Belize to the United Nations

References

External links 
 

1831 establishments in England
Educational institutions established in 1831
Faculties of King's College London
Law schools in England
Strand, London